Indrek Kannik (born 25 November 1965 Tallinn) is an Estonian journalist, civil servant, and politician. In 1994, he was the Minister of Defence and a member of VII Riigikogu.

References

Living people
1965 births
Estonian journalists
Members of the Riigikogu, 1992–1995
Members of the Riigikogu, 1995–1999
Defence Ministers of Estonia
University of Tartu alumni
Politicians from Tallinn